New York & Company, Inc. (NY&C) is an American workwear retailer for women.  New York & Company apparel and accessories are sold through a nationwide network of retail stores, and through its e-commerce site.

New York & Company was founded  in 1918 as Lerner Shops by Samuel A. Lerner and Harold M. Lane in New York City. Samuel Lerner was the uncle of lyricist Alan Jay Lerner. In 1992, the company changed its name to Lerner New York and in 1995 to New York & Company. They were publicly traded between 2004 and 2020.

NY&C history

1918 - The Lerner brothers, blouse manufacturers, opens the first Lerner Shops store in New York City; 18 more shops open later that year
1930 - The first West Coast Lerner Shops location opens in Los Angeles, California
1985 - Limited Brands purchases the company
1992 - The company changes its name to Lerner New York 
1995 - The company changes its name to New York & Company, one of several labels Lerner New York carries
2002 - New York & Company becomes an independent company when it is purchased from Limited Brands by Bear Stearns Merchant Banking
2004 - New York & Company goes public
2005 - Flagship NY&C store opens in New York City at 58th Street and Lexington Avenue
2006 - E-commerce site nyandcompany.com is launched
2010 - The New York & Company Outlet division is launched
2012 - NY&C Beauty, including fragrance, lip, and nail products, is launched
2013 - The Eva Mendes Collection, an exclusive collection designed in collaboration with actress Eva Mendes, is launched nationwide
2016 - CEO Gregory Scott and his company are featured in an episode of Undercover Boss.
2017 - Gabrielle Union launches a collection of clothing under the New York and Company brand.
2018 - Kate Hudson intros her line and is Ambassador for their Soho Jeans line.
2018 - Rebranding of New York & Co to RTW Retailwinds

Celebrity advertisements
Celebrities who have appeared in advertisements for New York & Company include Eva Longoria, Brooke Shields, Iman, Cindy Crawford, Jennifer Hudson, Maria Menounos, Ellen Pompeo, Patrick Dempsey,  Eva Mendes and Gabrielle Union and Kate Hudson.

References

External links
 

Clothing retailers of the United States
American companies established in 1918
Clothing companies established in 1918
Retail companies established in 1918
Clothing brands of the United States
Companies based in New York City
Companies formerly listed on the New York Stock Exchange
1918 establishments in New York City
1985 mergers and acquisitions
2004 initial public offerings
Companies that filed for Chapter 11 bankruptcy in 2020